The following is a list of events affecting 2015 in Indian television.

Television series debuts
Aadhe Adhoore
Aaj Ki Raat Hai Zindagi
Aponjon
Ishq Ka Rang Safed
Piya Rangrezz
Rukawat Ke Liye Khed Hai

Television series endings
 2025 Jaane Kya Hoga Aage
 Humsafars
 Jai Jai Jai Bajrang Bali
 Laut Aao Trisha

Television seasons
 Jhalak Dikhhla Jaa (season 8)
 MTV Love School
 MTV Roadies (season 12)

See also 
 :Category:2015 Indian television series debuts

References

 
2015 in India
Entertainment in India
Indian culture